Eakin is an English surname. Notable people with the surname include:

Bruce Eakin, Canadian ice-hockey player
Chris Eakin, British newsreader
Cody Eakin, Canadian ice-hockey player
Douglas Holtz-Eakin, American economist
Harvey Eakin, former NASCAR Cup Series driver
Jake Lee Eakin, American murder
John R. Eakin (1822–1885), Justice of the Arkansas Supreme Court
Kay Eakin (1917–1993), American football player
Kevin Eakin, American football quarterback
Michael Eakin, American judge
Richard M. Eakin (1910–1999), American zoologist
Richard R. Eakin (born 1938), chancellor of East Carolina University
Robert Eakin (1848–1917), American judge
Sue Eakin (1918–2009), American professor
William Eakin (1828–1918), Canadian politician

See also
Eakins
Justice Eakin (disambiguation)

English-language surnames